James Michael Rittwage (October 23, 1944 in Cleveland, Ohio) is a former Major League Baseball pitcher who played for one season. He pitched eight games for the Cleveland Indians during the 1970 season.

External links

1944 births
Living people
Cleveland Indians players
Major League Baseball pitchers
Baseball players from Cleveland
Charleston Indians players
Birmingham Barons players
Pawtucket Indians players
Waterbury Indians players
Portland Beavers players
Wichita Aeros players
Oklahoma City 89ers players
Tulsa Oilers (baseball) players